DeBaliviere Place is a neighborhood of St. Louis, Missouri.

Location

The DeBaliviere Place neighborhood is bounded by Delmar Boulevard on the north, Union Boulevard on the east, Lindell Boulevard on the south, and Debaliviere Avenue on the west.

Characteristics

The DeBaliviere Place neighborhood is quite diverse in its housing stock, ranging from beautiful single-family homes to upscale renovated apartments and spacious condominiums. Lindell Boulevard contains some of the most beautiful mansions in the city, overlooking lovely Forest Park. Washington Terrace, Kingsbury, and Waterman Places are exquisite samples of St. Louis' unique private places, containing gorgeous 19th-century houses, true architectural gems. Union Boulevard has numerous old high-rise apartment buildings. The neighborhood has two private swimming pools and tennis courts for residents’ recreational use.

Shops and businesses line DeBaliviere, Belt, Clara, and Delmar. The MetroLink light rail system stops on DeBaliviere and on nearby Delmar. The neighborhood is across the street from Forest Park, two blocks from Washington University, right next door to the popular Central West End, and close to the Delmar Loop.

Demographics

In 2020 the neighborhood's population was 55.0% White, 25.0% Black, 0.3% Native American, 10.9% Asian, 6.9% Two or More Races, and 1.9% Some Other Race. 5.0% of the population was of Hispanic or Latino origin.

References 

Neighborhoods in St. Louis